Gaižiūnai is a village in Jonava district municipality, Lithuania. The railroad from Šiauliai forks into Kaunas and Vilnius near the village. Gaižiūnai is also known as a military base.

Military base
The old military training ground in Varėna could not be used by the Lithuanian Army as it was too close to the demarcation line with Poland and stirred Polish protests. The new training grounds included an airfield, railway connection, and numerous buildings for the soldiers. In 1939, according to the Soviet–Lithuanian Mutual Assistance Treaty, about 5,000 Russian soldiers were stationed in the military base. After World War II, the Soviets expanded the base and built a military town in Rukla. When Lithuania regained its independence the bases were adopted for its needs.

See also
 Pabradė
 Rukla

References

Villages in Jonava District Municipality